William Herring (1718 – 1774, in Salisbury) was an Anglican priest, most notably Dean of St Asaph from 1751 until 1774.

William was born in Norwich, and educated at Norwich School and Clare College, Cambridge. He held livings at Alburgh, Edgefield and Bolton Percy. At a time when plurality was common he was also a prebendary of York from 1744; and Precentor of Salisbury from 1754.

References

1718 births
People educated at Norwich School
Alumni of Clare College, Cambridge
Deans of St Asaph
1774 deaths
Clergy from Norwich